The men's road race C4-5 cycling event at the 2020 Summer Paralympics took place on 3 September 2021, at the Fuji Speedway in Shizuoka Prefecture. 14 riders competed in the event.

The event covers the following two classifications, that all use standard bicycles:
C4: cyclists with mild hemiplegic or diplegic spasticity; mild athetosis or ataxia; unilateral below-knee or bilateral below elbow amputation, etc. tetraplegics with severe upper limb impairment to the C6 vertebra.
C5: cyclists with mild monoplegic spasticity; unilateral arm amputation (above or below elbow), etcetera.

Results
The event took place on 3 September 2021 at 9:30.

s.t. Same time

References

Men's road race C4-5